Karl Georg Theodor Kotschy  (15 April 1813 – 11 June 1866) was an Austrian botanist and explorer.
On his botanical investigations, Kotschy collected large amount of plants  and herbs. He also described forty species of oaks in this work, some of them new to science.

Biography
Kotschy was born in Ustroń in Austrian Silesia (today Poland). He was the son of theologian Carl Friedrich Kotschy (1789–1856).

Kotschy studied theology in Vienna from 1833.
From 1836 to 1862 he performed extensive botanical research throughout the Middle East and northern Africa, in which he collected over 300,000 botanical specimens. Beginning in 1836, he accompanied geologist Joseph Russegger (1802–1863) on a scientific trip to Cilicia and Syria, afterwards journeying through Nubia and Sennar. Following the dissolution with Russegger's expedition, he remained in Egypt. He later traveled to Kurdufan (1839), Cyprus, Syria, Mesopotamia and Kurdistan (1840–41); and during 1842–43 he undertook an expedition to Persia. 

He was appointed Assistant Curator in 1847 and Custos-Adjunct in 1852 at Vienna.  In 1862 he performed additional botanical research in Egypt, Palestine, and Lebanon (1855) in Cyprus, Asia Minor, and Kurdistan (1859), and back to Cyprus (1862). He died in Vienna at the age of 53.

Legacy
The plant genus Kotschya from the family Fabaceae is named in his honor. His name is associated with a species of lizard, "Kotschy’s gecko" (Cyrtopodion kotschyi ), and with the Cyprus bee orchid (Ophrys kotschyi). His name is also used for a crocus species - Crocus kotschyanus, discovered by him in SE Turkey.

Selected publications 
 Reise in den cilicischen Taurus überTarsus. (1858); First description of the region of Bulghar Dagh, western Taurus. 
 Abbildungen und Beschreibungen neuer und seltener Thiere und Pflanzen, in Syrien und im westlichen Taurus gesammelt, (Illustrations and descriptions of new and rare animals and plants, in Syria and western Taurus); (1843) 
 Analecta botanica (with Heinrich Wilhelm Schott (1794–1865) and Carl Fredrik Nyman 1820–1893), (1854) 
 Coniferen des Cilicischen Taurus (Conifers of Cilician Taurus), (with Franz Antoine 1815–1886), (1855) 
 Die Eichen Europas und des Orients, (Oaks of Europe and the Orient); (1858–1862) 
 Plantae Tinneanae  (with Johann Joseph Peyritsch 1835–1889); (1867)

References

Note
 Parts of this article are based on a translation of an equivalent article at the German Wikipedia.

External links
 Itinerary in southern Persia 1842-43 biography of Theodor Kotschy
 Die Eichen Europas und des Orients - High-resolution scan of Kotschy's book of descriptions and illustrations of oaks.
 

1813 births
1866 deaths
People from Ustroń
19th-century Austrian botanists
People from Austrian Silesia
Austrian people of Polish descent
Travelers in Asia Minor